William J. Hibbler (August 7, 1946 – March 19, 2012) was a United States district judge of the United States District Court for the Northern District of Illinois.

Education and career

Born in Kennedy, Alabama, Hibbler received a Bachelor of Science degree from the University of Illinois at Chicago in 1969 and a Juris Doctor from DePaul University College of Law in 1973. He was an assistant state's attorney of the Cook County State's Attorney Office from 1973 to 1977. He was in private practice in Chicago, Illinois from 1977 to 1981, returning to the Cook County State's Attorney Office from 1981 to 1986. He was an associate judge, Cook County Circuit Court from 1986 to 1999, while also teaching as an adjunct professor in the Chicago–Kent College of Law from 1989 to 1999.

Federal judicial service

On January 26, 1999, Hibbler was nominated by President Bill Clinton to a seat on the United States District Court for the Northern District of Illinois vacated by Judge James Alesia. Hibbler was confirmed by the United States Senate on April 15, 1999, and received his commission on April 22, 1999. Hibbler died Monday March 19, 2012 at age 65 after an unspecified illness.

See also 
 List of African-American federal judges
 List of African-American jurists

References

Sources

1946 births
2012 deaths
African-American judges
DePaul University College of Law alumni
Judges of the United States District Court for the Northern District of Illinois
People from Lamar County, Alabama
United States district court judges appointed by Bill Clinton
University of Illinois Chicago alumni
University of Chicago Law School faculty
20th-century American judges
Judges of the Circuit Court of Cook County
21st-century American judges